Nijam is a 2003 Indian Telugu-language action film written, directed and produced by Teja on Chitram Movies banner. The film stars Mahesh Babu, Rakshita, Gopichand, and Raasi, with music was composed by R. P. Patnaik. Babu and Rameshwari won the Nandi Awards in Best Actor and Best Supporting Actress categories respectively. It was remade  in Odia as Arjuna and in Bangladesh as Top Leader.

Plot
Sidda Reddy is a powerful mafia leader whose right hand is Devudu. Devudu has a lover named Malli. Reddy, who also likes Malli, takes her to his bed, which is not liked by Devudu. Eventually, Devudu kills Reddy and becomes the leader of the mafia gang. Venkateswarlu is a fire officer. In an incident, Devudu sets a marketplace on fire and Venkateswarlu rescues it with his firefighting, and at the same time, Venkateswarlu slaps Devudu, as he continues throwing kerosene at the marketplace. Devudu holds a grudge against Venkateswarlu and sends him to jail on a framed charge of the murder of Malli's brother Baddu. G. Seetaram, Venkateswarlu's son, tries to rescue his father from the jaws of the police. But in the process, everybody starts asking him for a bribe to do the work. At the end of the day, the police officer and Devudu kill Venkateswarlu. The rest of the story is about how Seetaram's mother takes revenge on the people responsible for the death of her husband with the help of her son Seetaram. The people involved in the crime of his father's death are killed one after the other by the mother and son in a planned and scientific manner. This film tells about an innocent boy, who, along with his mother undergoes injustice and also loses his father in this process. The mother in this situation plays the role of a trainer and guide to her son, making him strong physically and emotionally, to fight back.

Cast

Mahesh Babu as G. Seetaram
Rakshita as Janki
Gopichand as Devadaya Sharma "Devudu" 
Raasi as Malli
Prakash Raj as ACP Raja Narendra
Jaya Prakash Reddy as Sidda Reddy
Ranganath as G. Venkateswarlu, Sitaram's father
Rameshwari as Shanti, Sitaram's mother
Brahmaji as C.I.
Vijayachander as DGP
Jeeva as DCP Murali Krishna
Suman Setty as Baddu
Kanta Rao as Social Worker Narayana Rao
Rallapalli as Butcher
Dharmavarapu Subrahmanyam as Traffic Constable
Kondavalasa as Sitaram's neighbor
Duvvasi Mohan as Patil
Tirupathi Prakash
Shakeela
Mani Chandana as an item number Rathalu
Alapati Lakshmi
Master Ghatamaneni Jaya Krishna as Young Sitaram

Soundtrack

Music was composed by R. P. Patnaik. Lyrics were penned by Kula Shekar. Music was released on Aditya Music.

Legacy and Remakes
The film was also dubbed into Tamil as Nijam, and then again in 2012 as Seerum Singam. The film was dubbed as Meri Adalat in Hindi in 2008, in Bengali as Aamar Protishodh and in Bhojpuri as Hamaar Faisla. It was remade as Arjuna in Oriya starring Anubhab Mohanty and Gargi Mohanty & Bangladesh as Top Leader starring Shakib Khan.

Reception and collections
Idlebrain Jeevi in his review gave a rating of 3 out of 5 for the movie with concluding remarks "Overall, it's an average film that has chances to become hit because of the Teja's mass-attracting episodes and Mahesh Babu's brilliant portrayal of the character".

Director Teja in an interview said "We made Nijam in a budget of 6.5 cr INR; We sold audio rights for 2 cr INR and movie initially were sold for a total of 26 cr INR. In total, we made a profit of 5-6 cr INR and Nijam was not a flop". He corroborated the same in an interview with The Hindu "I worked with Mahesh after he had a flop called Bobby, but Nijam released after Okkadu and people drew comparisons. I don’t argue when people say Nijam was a flop. The film was made with a budget of Rs. 6.5 crore and sold for Rs. 21 crore. I repaid money to whoever lost money and still made a huge profit".

Awards

Won
Nandi Awards
 Best Actor - Mahesh Babu
 Best Supporting Actress - Talluri Rameshwari

CineMAA Awards
 Best Villain - Gopichand

Filmfare Awards South
 Best Actor - Telugu - Mahesh Babu

Nominated
 Filmfare Award for Best Supporting Actress - Telugu - Taluri Rameswari 

CineMAA Awards
 CineMAA Award for Best Actor - Male - Mahesh Babu 
 CineMAA Award for Best Film - Teja

References

External links
 

2003 films
Films about corruption in India
2000s Telugu-language films
Telugu films remade in other languages
Films directed by Teja (film director)
Indian vigilante films
Indian action films
Indian films about revenge
Films scored by R. P. Patnaik
2003 action films
2000s vigilante films